The Regent (City Creek) is a  gold LEED certified, 23-storey, 150-unit residential skyscraper located in the City Creek Center, on 35 East 100 South, Salt Lake City, Utah. The building was the fifth residential skyscraper in the City Creek development and was designed by Zimmer Gunsul Frasca Partnership in a modernist style. The building was completed on September 11, 2011.

History
The Regent was officially planned on 3 October 2006 as part of a major redevelopment of two blocks in the center of Salt Lake City, which would become the City Creek Center. The original name was Tower 5 as it was the 5th residential skyscraper planned in the redevelopment.

Despite being designed and planned at the same time as the entire City Creek Center, The Regent is the only residential building built in a modernist style. The syle of tinted blue curtain glass walls and concrete constructions makes it one of the more appealing residential buildings in the City Creek Center. The Regent was not built during the first phase of construction and was one of the last buildings to be constructed in the redevelopment.

Design

The residential skyscraper has 20 floors of 150-residential units above 3 floors of mixed use office and retail space, the 3rd floor includes a pool, fitness centers and entertainment rooms. The modernist style of the build, tinted blue glass and balconies on every residential floor makes it one of the more desirable residential skyscrapers in Salt Lake City and in Utah,. The 23 storey building also has a controlled underground parking lot, for all residents and workers.

The Regent is located on the south western corner of the block and allows for easy access to all amenities in the block including the City Creek Center itself. The project allows for people to live, work and enjoy all on the same block even without going outside. The Regent itself has direct connections to its parking lot.

Interior Design
The main lobby, like the tower, was built in a modernist with glass curtain walls and crystal white walls. All of the 150 residential units have floor to ceiling windows. The 150 units range in size from 800 to 2,100 square feet with 2 penthouse suites. The apartments of The Regent are some of the most expensive in the city, with all suites coming with wooden floors, natural stone walls and countertops, and fireplaces. All apartments have views of the city and the nearby Wasatch Range and Oquirrh Mountains.

Construction
The Regent was constructed using two cranes but after the main building had been constructed and the cranes had been removed, many items too big for the elevators had to be placed in all the residential units. The main contractors, Jacobsen Construction came up with a Push & Pulley system to hoist the items and material through the double doors on each balcony. It took the Jacobsen Construction team a total of six days to lay every concrete floor; the project itself consumed a total of 22,634 cubic yards of concrete. To lay the concrete they had to use specially designed forming systems.

LEED Certification
During the construction of the skyscraper, a silver LEED certification was achieved. Despite having a Silver certificate, the skyscraper was only a few credits short of the prestigious Gold certificate so the architects Zimmer Gunsul Frasca devised a solution to achieve that certificate.

See also

 99 West on South Temple
 City Creek Center
 City Creek (Utah)
 Richard Court (building)

References

External links 

 Official website

Leadership in Energy and Environmental Design gold certified buildings
Residential buildings completed in 2011
Residential condominiums in the United States
Residential skyscrapers in Salt Lake City